Philip Holst-Cappelen (born André Simjak in 1965) was a Norwegian convicted serial fraudster and kidnapper who had received significant media attention in Scandinavia. In 2000, he was placed on an Interpol red notice, and after one year he was arrested at Copenhagen Airport. He was convicted of 120 crimes and sentenced to 4.5 years imprisonment in 2002. Holst-Cappelen escaped from prison while serving his sentence at Bastøy Prison. In 2008 he was arrested again by armed police in Oslo, after having defrauded Norwegian billionaire Jan Haudemann-Andersen.

In 2011 Holst-Cappelen was accused of kidnapping two Swedish millionaires. According to police the two men were imprisoned in their own homes and forced to [bank] transfer 15.6 million Swedish kronor. He was placed on a new Interpol red notice in 2010. In 2011 he was arrested by Spanish police. In June 2011 Holst-Cappelen was sentenced to 18 years imprisonment in Sweden. He changed names several times, and he had no connection to the Norwegian families Holst or Cappelen.

Holst-Cappelen died on 19 July 2018 following a hunger strike while incarcerated in Saltvik Prison.

References

1965 births
2018 deaths
21st-century Norwegian criminals
Norwegian male criminals
Norwegian fraudsters
Norwegian prisoners and detainees
Escapees from Norwegian detention
Prisoners and detainees of Norway
Prisoners and detainees of Sweden